María del Rosario Cayetana Fitz-James Stuart y Silva, 18th Duchess of Alba GE (28 March 1926 – 20 November 2014) was one of the most senior aristocrats in Spain, as well as the most titled aristocrat in the world, a distinction now held by the Princess Victoria of Hohenlohe-Langenburg, 20th Duchess of Medinaceli.

Family 

Born in Liria Palace in Madrid on 28 March 1926, Cayetana Fitz-James Stuart was the only child of the 17th Duke of Alba (a prominent Spanish politician and diplomat during the 1930s and 1940s) and his wife, María del Rosario de Silva y Gurtubay, 9th Marchioness of San Vicente del Barco. She was the eight-greats granddaughter of James II. Her godmother was Queen Victoria Eugenie, the wife of King Alfonso XIII of Spain.

Socialite 
As a socialite, the Duchess met famous VIPs from Spain and abroad. Jackie Kennedy visited her Seville palace, as did Wallis Simpson, Grace Kelly and Prince Rainier III of Monaco. In 1959, the Duchess, together with designer Yves Saint Laurent, hosted a Dior show for charitable purposes in her Liria Palace, Madrid, a palace which movie stars Charlton Heston, Sophia Loren, Audrey Hepburn and Raf Vallone visited. In her youth the Duchess posed for Richard Avedon and Cecil Beaton and she appeared on the cover of Time and Harper's Bazaar.

She was inducted into Vanity Fair'''s International Best Dressed List Hall of Fame in 2011.

Marriages
On 12 October 1947, the Duchess married Don Luis Martínez de Irujo y Artázcoz (1919–1972), younger son of the Duke of Sotomayor and his wife Ana María de Artázcoz y Labayen (1892–1930), court lady of Queen Victoria Eugenia of Spain. The wedding in Spain, two years after the end of World War II, resisted the decline in frequency of very extravagant European weddings among high nobility and attracted the attention of the international media. The New York Times called it "the most expensive wedding of the world." It was reported that 20 million pesetas (equivalent to $10,000,000 rounded in 2015) was spent.

Six children were born of this marriage:
 Carlos Fitz-James Stuart, 19th Duke of Alba (born 2 October 1948, Madrid)
 Alfonso Martínez de Irujo y Fitz-James Stuart, 18th Duke of Híjar (born 22 October 1950, Madrid)
 Jacobo Fitz-James Stuart y Martínez de Irujo, 23rd Count of Siruela (born 15 July 1954, Madrid)
 Fernando Martínez de Irujo y Fitz-James Stuart, 11th Marquis of San Vicente del Barco (born 11 July 1959)
 Cayetano Martínez de Irujo y Fitz-James Stuart, 4th Duke of Arjona, 13th Count of Salvatierra (born 4 April 1963, Madrid)
Eugenia Martínez de Irujo, 12th Duchess of Montoro (born 26 November 1968)

Widowed in 1972, the Duchess remarried first on 16 March 1978 Jesús Aguirre y Ortiz de Zárate (1934–2001), a Doctor of Theology and a former Jesuit priest. The wedding caused shock; Aguirre was illegitimate, which carried a stigma among the wealthy and devout in 1970s Spain. Eight years younger than the Duchess, he maintained a good relationship with her children. During their marriage he administered, with his stepson Carlos, the Alba estates. Aguirre died in 2001.

The re-widowed Duchess expressed her wish to marry Alfonso Díez Carabantes in the 2000s, a civil servant who separately had a public relations business, 24 years her junior. It was reported objections came from her children and from King Juan Carlos. The House of Alba in 2008 issued a statement saying that the relationship "was based on a long friendship and there are no plans to marry". The duchess decided to proceed and gave her children their inheritance which included majestic palaces in Spain, paintings by old and modern masters (from Fra Angelico, Titian and Goya to Renoir and Marc Chagall), a first-edition copy of Cervantes's Don Quixote, letters written by Christopher Columbus, and substantial land; her wealth was estimated at between €600 million and €3.5 billion. Díez formally renounced any claim to her wealth. They married on 5 October 2011 at the Palacio de las Dueñas in Seville. The Duchess, whose passions included flamenco, performed a quick few steps of the dance in front of the crowds that had gathered outside the palace on the day of the wedding.

Death

The Duchess died in the Palacio de las Dueñas on 20 November 2014, at the age of 88. She was succeeded by her son Carlos Fitz-James Stuart, 14th Duke of Huéscar, who thus became the 19th Duke of Alba. At the time of her death, her net worth was estimated to be $5 billion.

The Duchess' body was laid in repose at the Town Hall, where thousands of civilians paid their last respects. Pictures of the Duchess with her family were placed at her coffin. The King of Spain telephoned her son to pay his respects and sent two flower crowns to Seville. The Lord Mayor said that the flags of the city would be lowered in mourning. Juan José Asenjo and Curro Romero, and Mariano Rajoy, Spain's prime minister, also formally paid their respects. Her funeral was held at Seville Cathedral by Carlos Amigo Vallejo, where the Royal Family was represented by the Infanta Elena.

Titles, styles, honours and arms

As head of the dynasty, Cayetana Fitz-James Stuart was styled by her most senior title of "Duchess of Alba", whilst holding over 40 other hereditary titles. According to Guinness World Records'', she was the most titled aristocrat in the world.

Titles
Dukedoms
18th Duchess of Alba, Grandee of Spain
15th Duchess of Aliaga, Grandee of Spain -Ceded to her son Don Alfonso
4th Duchess of Arjona, Grandee of Spain -Ceded to her son Don Cayetano
11th Duchess of Berwick, Grandee of Spain
17th Duchess of Híjar, Grandee of Spain -Ceded to her son Don Alfonso
11th Duchess of Liria and Jérica, Grandee of Spain
11th Duchess of Montoro, Grandee of Spain -Ceded to her daughter Doña Eugenia

Count-dukedoms
12th Countess-Duchess of Olivares, Grandee of Spain

Marquessates
17th Marchioness of the Carpio, Grandee of Spain
10th Marchioness of San Vicente del Barco, Grandee of Spain -Ceded to her son Don Fernando
16th Marchioness of La Algaba
16th Marchioness of Almenara -Ceded to her son Don Alfonso
18th Marchioness of Barcarrota
10th Marchioness of Castañeda
23rd Marchioness of Coria
14th Marchioness of Eliche
16th Marchioness of Mirallo
20th Marchioness of la Mota
20th Marchioness of Moya
17th Marchioness of Orani -Ceded to her son Don Alfonso
12th Marchioness of Osera
14th Marchioness of San Leonardo
19th Marchioness of Sarria
12th Marchioness of Tarazona
15th Marchioness of Valdunquillo
18th Marchioness of Villanueva del Fresno
17th Marchioness of Villanueva del Río

Countships
27th Countess of Aranda, Grandee of Spain -Ceded to her son Don Alfonso
22nd Countess of Lemos, Grandee of Spain
20th Countess of Lerín, Grandee of Spain, Constabless of Navarre
20th Countess of Miranda del Castañar, Grandee of Spain
16th Countess of Monterrey, Grandee of Spain
20th Countess of Osorno, Grandee of Spain
18th Countess of Palma del Río, Grandee of Spain -Ceded to her son Don Alfonso
12th Countess of Salvatierra, Grandee of Spain -Ceded to her son Don Cayetano
22nd Countess of Siruela, Grandee of Spain -Ceded to her son Don Jacobo
19th Countess of Andrade
14th Countess of Ayala
16th Countess of Casarrubios del Monte
16th Countess of Fuentes de Valdepero
11th Countess of Fuentidueña
17th Countess of Galve
18th Countess of Gelves
16th Countess of Guimerá -Ceded to her son Don Alfonso
21st Countess of Modica (Kingdom of Sicily)
24th Countess of Ribadeo -Ceded to her son Don Alfonso
25th Countess of San Esteban de Gormaz
12th Countess of Santa Cruz de la Sierra
20th Countess of Villalba

Viscountcies
12th Viscountess of la Calzada

Lordships
29th Lady of Moguer

Honours
National honours
 : Knight Grand Cross of the Royal Order of Isabella the Catholic
 : Knight Grand Cross of the Civil Order of Alfonso X, the Wise
 : Knight of the Royal and Military Order of Saint Hermenegild
 : Knight Grand Cross of the Order of Alcántara
 : Knight Grand Cross of the Civil Order of Charity
 : Knight Grand Cross of the Civil Order of Agricultural Merit
  Recipient of the Medal of Andalusia
 : Recipient of the Medal of Concepción
 : Recipient of the Medal of Línea
 : Recipient of the Medal of The Community of Madrid
 : Former Grand Master Recipient of the Medal of The Spanish Red Cross
 : Recipient of the Medal of Suffering for the Motherland

Foreign honours
  Greek royal family: Dame Grand Cross of the Order of Beneficence
  House of Bourbon-Two Sicilies Dame Grand Cross of Justice of the Calabrian Two Sicilian Order of Saint George
 : Wisteria Dame of the Order of the Precious Crown, 4th Class

Honorary appointments
National honorary appointments

 : Marshal of Castilla-La Mancha
 : Constable of Aragon
  Llíria: Honorary Mayor of Llíria
 : Knight of the Royal Cavalry Armory of Seville
 : Honorary President of the Spanish Red Cross
 : Honorary President of the Spanish National Orchestra
 : Honorary President of the Real Academia de Bellas Artes de San Fernando

Foreign honorary appointments
 : Member of the Hispanic Society of America
 : Member of the American Academy of Arts and Sciences

References

External links

 House of Híjar
 Euskomedia
 The Late Duchess of Alba audio clip of name.
 Obituary in The Independent by Marcus Williamson 

1926 births
2014 deaths
Grandees of Spain
Spanish duchesses
Marquesses of Spain
Spanish countesses
Italian countesses
Viscounts of Spain
Lords of Spain
20th-century Spanish nobility
Nobility from Madrid
Cayetana
Dukes of Almazan
Berwick, Cayetana Fitz-James Stuart, Duchess of
Dukes of Montoro
Dukes of Olivares
Cayetana
Marquesses of Carpio
Counts of Fuentes
Counts of Galve
Counts of Lemos
Counts of Monterrey
Counts of Osorno
Counts of San Esteban de Gormaz
Recipients of the Order of Isabella the Catholic
Knights Grand Cross of the Order of Isabella the Catholic
Recipients of the Civil Order of Alfonso X, the Wise
Recipients of the Royal and Military Order of Saint Hermenegild
Knights of the Order of Alcántara
Grand Crosses of the Order of Beneficence (Greece)
Order of the Precious Crown members
Female billionaires
Spanish billionaires
Spanish socialites